Bahreman (also Romanized as Bahremān and Bahrāmān) is a village in Abarghan Rural District, in the Central District of Sarab County, East Azerbaijan Province, Iran. At the 2006 census, its population was 738, in 158 families.

References 

Populated places in Sarab County